Charles Whitworth may refer to
Charles Whitworth, 1st Baron Whitworth of Galway (1675–1725), British diplomat and MP for Newport Isle of Wight (1722–1725)
Sir Charles Whitworth (MP) (c. 1721–1778), his nephew and a British MP 
Charles Whitworth, 1st Earl Whitworth (1752–1825), British diplomat and politician, also Barons Whitworth of Newport Pratt and Viscount Whitworth